Daniel Zhang Yong is a Chinese technology executive. He is currently the CEO of Alibaba Group. Before becoming the CEO, Zhang was best known for his roles as CEO of Taobao and president of Tmall (owned by Alibaba). While running Tmall, Zhang created the Singles' Day shopping holiday, an annual Chinese sales event with gross sales reaching four times higher than Black Friday and Cyber Monday combined.

In 2020, Zhang was included on Times list of the 100 most influential people in the world.

Early life and education
Zhang was born in Shanghai in 1972. He studied finance at Shanghai University of Finance and Economics.

Career

After graduation, he worked for Barings Bank, just before its bankruptcy due to trader Nick Leeson. 1995–2002, he worked for one of the former "Big Five" accounting firms Arthur Andersen which collapsed due to the Enron scandal. He then worked for PwC for two years starting in 2002.
 
Zhang first joined Taobao (an Alibaba subsidiary) in 2007 as its chief financial officer. The following year he became the chief operating officer of Taobao. In 2011, Zhang was promoted to president of Tmall, a business-to-consumer shopping spinoff from Taobao. It was during his time running Tmall that Zhang launched the Singles' Day shopping event.

In 2013, Zhang was promoted to chief operating officer of Alibaba Group, and eventually succeeded Jonathan Lu as the CEO in 2015. On September 10, 2018, Jack Ma announced that Zhang would also take over as executive chairman, effective in one year on September 10, 2019.

Alibaba employees pick nicknames for themselves when they first join the company. Daniel Zhang's nickname is "Free and Unfettered Person".

References

1972 births
Living people
21st-century Chinese businesspeople
Alibaba Group people
Businesspeople from Shanghai
Chinese chief financial officers
Chinese chief executives
Chinese computer businesspeople
PricewaterhouseCoopers people
Shanghai University of Finance and Economics alumni
Shanda people